The Year's Best Science Fiction: Third Annual Collection is a collection of science fiction short stories edited by Gardner Dozois and published in 1986.

Contents
 "The Jaguar Hunter" by Lucius Shepard
 "Dogfight" by Michael Swanwick and William Gibson
 "Fermi and Frost" by Frederik Pohl
 "Green Days in Brunei" by Bruce Sterling
 "Snow" by John Crowley
 "The Fringe" by Orson Scott Card
 "The Lake Was Full of Artificial Things" by Karen Joy Fowler
 "Sailing to Byzantium" by Robert Silverberg
 "Solstice" by James Patrick Kelly
 "Duke Pasquale's Ring" by Avram Davidson
 "More Than the Sum of His Parts" by Joe Haldeman
 "Out of All Them Bright Stars" by Nancy Kress
 "Side Effects" by Walter Jon Williams
 "The Only Neat Thing to Do" by James Tiptree, Jr.
 "Dinner in Audoghast" by Bruce Sterling
 "Under Siege" by George R. R. Martin
 "Flying Saucer Rock & Roll" by Howard Waldrop
 "A Spanish Lesson" by Lucius Shepard
 "Roadside Rescue" by Pat Cadigan
 "Paper Dragons" by James P. Blaylock
 "Magazine Section" by R. A. Lafferty
 "The War at Home" by Lewis Shiner
 "Rockabye Baby" by S.C. Sykes
 "Green Mars" by Kim Stanley Robinson

References

External links
Story synopses by Brian Davies (scroll down)

03
1986 anthologies
St. Martin's Press books